Joe Dabney (January 29, 1929 – December 26, 2015) was an American author. He received the 2005 Lifetime Achievement Award from the  Southern Foodways Alliance and his Smokehouse Ham, Spoon Bread & Scuppernong Wine won the James Beard Cookbook of the Year award in 1999. He also authored Mountain Spirits about American moonshine. He uses oral histories and historical research.

Bibliography
 Mountain spirits: a chronicle of corn whiskey from King James' Ulster plantation to America's Appalachians and the moonshine life (1974)
 HERK: hero of the skies (1979)
 More mountain spirits: the continuing chronicle of moonshine life and corn whiskey, wines, ciders & beers in America's Appalachians (1985)
 Smokehouse ham, spoon bread & scuppernong wine: the folklore and art of Southern Appalachian cooking (1998)
 The Food, folklore, and art of lowcountry cooking: a Celebration of the foods, history, and romance handed down from England, Africa, the Caribbean, France, Germany, and Scotland (2010)

References

American male writers
2015 deaths
1929 births
James Beard Foundation Award winners